Soap Fever is a British television Entertainment programme on ITV2 presented by Liza Tarbuck, Denise Welch, Emma Kennedy, Jordan Davies, Jenny Powell and towards the end of its run Fiona Phillips and Penny Smith.

Each week the show would feature soap recaps and previews, news, competitions plus each week an exclusive interview with a top soap star or stars.

The show was broadcast on Sunday nights usually at 6:30pm (6:00pm towards the end of its run). It was written by Karl Lucas who also co-starred on the show and presented features.

External links 
 

ITV (TV network) original programming
1999 British television series debuts
2002 British television series endings